Khafr may refer to:
Khafr, Fars
Khafr, Natanz, Isfahan Province
Khafr, Semirom, Isfahan Province
Khafr District, in Fars Province
Khafr Rural District, in Fars Province